Coldwater High School may refer to:

Coldwater High School (Michigan) — Coldwater, Michigan
Coldwater High School (Mississippi) — Coldwater, Mississippi
Coldwater High School (Ohio) — Coldwater, Ohio